Darreh Besar (also known as Darreh Besar-e Pā’īn and Darreh Besar-e Soflá) is a village in Beyranvand-e Jonubi Rural District, Bayravand District, Khorramabad County, Lorestan Province, Iran. At the 2006 census, its population was 40, in 9 families.

References 

Towns and villages in Khorramabad County